Tegan Jovanka is a fictional character played by Janet Fielding in the long-running British science fiction television series Doctor Who. An Australian airline stewardess and a native of Brisbane who was a companion of the Fourth and Fifth Doctors, she was a regular in the programme from 1981 to 1984. Tegan appeared in 20 stories (65 episodes).

According to producer John Nathan-Turner, when he was thinking of a name for the character, it was either going to be Tegan, after his partner's niece in Australia, or Jovanka, after Jovanka Broz, the widow of Yugoslavian President Josip Broz Tito, so he wrote both down on a piece of paper. Script editor Christopher H. Bidmead mistakenly believed that Jovanka was the character's last name rather than an alternative, and so christened her Tegan Jovanka.

Character history
Tegan first appears in the Fourth Doctor's last serial, Logopolis. En route to Heathrow Airport to start her new job as a stewardess with Air Australia, her aunt Vanessa's vehicle (in which she is riding) suffers a flat tyre. Tegan enters a roadside police box to seek help, not knowing that it is actually the Doctor's disguised TARDIS. She is present when the Fourth Doctor falls from the Pharos Project radio telescope and regenerates into his fifth incarnation, and continues to journey with the Doctor and his other companions. She travels with the Doctor initially because her aunt was killed by the Master, although she still wants to get to Heathrow Airport to start her new job, as soon as the Doctor can get her there.

Tegan is stubborn, loud, and direct, with a no-nonsense manner and not afraid to speak her mind (in Earthshock she describes herself as "just a mouth on legs"). Her time in the TARDIS coincides with that of Adric, Nyssa, Turlough and Kamelion. While she often bickers with them (particularly with Adric) as well as with the Doctor, her strength of character keeps them together and her loyalty and affection to her crewmates is unquestionable. She is close to Nyssa, and is especially saddened at her leaving. She is initially very suspicious of Turlough, frequently referring to him as a "brat" at first, though they gradually become friends. The Doctor notes that she is a good coordinator, and often encourages her with the words, "Brave heart, Tegan." She is apparently able to speak at least one Indigenous Australian language fluently, and shows an ability to use firearms.

Despite her strong front, however, her adventures with the Doctor, both thrilling and terrifying, eventually take a psychological toll. She is deeply upset by the death of Adric in Earthshock. After being left behind in Heathrow due to a misunderstanding at the end of Time-Flight, she returns to the TARDIS in the next adventure Arc of Infinity, which is set about a year later in Earth time (Although the Doctor and Nyssa have been depicted having several adventures in that time frame in the audio adventures). During that period, Tegan had worked as a stewardess, but had been subsequently fired. Soon after, she is once again possessed by the alien intelligence known as the Mara. Eventually, the carnage surrounding the events of Resurrection of the Daleks proves too much and she bids an emotional good-bye to both the Doctor and Turlough in 1984 London.

Tegan Jovanka is one of the few companions of the classic series to be seen to have an extended family. She had an Australian aunt in the UK named Vanessa (Dolore Whiteman). In Logopolis it is said that Tegan's father owned an Australian farm. Tegan's English maternal grandfather Andrew Verney (Frederick Hall) was a local historian who had a cottage in the English village of Little Hodcombe in The Awakening, and her cousin Colin Frazer (Alastair Cumming) lived in Brisbane but was terrorised by Omega whilst back-packing in Amsterdam during Arc of Infinity.

Tegan appeared in the series' 2022 specials celebrating the BBC Centenary, alongside the returning former companion Ace.

Other mentions
An illusory image of Tegan is seen during the Fifth Doctor's regeneration into the Sixth in The Caves of Androzani (1984).

In The Twin Dilemma and Attack of the Cybermen (1985), The Sixth Doctor calls his companion Peri 'Tegan', which leads into Peri telling the Doctor that he has called her 'Tegan' amongst many other names.

In the 2007 Children in Need special episode "Time Crash", the Tenth Doctor asks his fifth incarnation if he is still travelling with Tegan in his own relative timeline.

In The Sarah Jane Adventures two-parter Death of the Doctor (2010), Tegan is mentioned as having campaigned for the rights of Indigenous Australians.

In "The Crimson Horror" (2013), the Eleventh Doctor tells Clara Oswald that he spent a long time trying to get a "gobby Australian" to Heathrow Airports. A scream is then heard, and he says "Brave heart, Clara."

A 2020 short published to the official Doctor Who YouTube channel and titled Farewell, Sarah Jane, written by former Doctor Who showrunner Russell T. Davies, revealed that Tegan was in a relationship with fellow traveller Nyssa.

Other appearances
Fielding reprised the role in a 1985 sketch ("A Fix with Sontarans") for the children's show Jim'll Fix It alongside Colin Baker as the Sixth Doctor. This sketch suggests Tegan returns to the life of a flight attendant and has also frosted her hair blonde, before being accidentally returned to the TARDIS by the Sixth Doctor.

Tegan's life after journeying with the Doctor is investigated in the Big Finish Productions 2006 audio drama The Gathering. Although she finds it difficult to enter into relationships and is suffering from a terminal illness, she tells the Doctor that she has no regrets about her time with him, and now appreciates her life to the full.

The spin-off fiction suggests that she was briefly married to pop star Johnny Chester (also known as Johnny Chess), the son of the First Doctor's companions Ian Chesterton and Barbara Wright. In the spin-off short story "Good Companions" by Peter Anghelides Tegan has suffered a nervous breakdown and convinced herself that her time with the Doctor was a delusion.

In the promotional video for the season 19 Blu-ray box set, Fielding reprised her role as Tegan, this time appearing as the owner and Chief Executive Officer of Jovanka Airlines, parodying flight take off instructions for passengers once they have boarded, with Peter Davison and Sarah Sutton playing the passengers.

List of appearances

Television
Season 18
Logopolis
Season 19

Castrovalva
Four to Doomsday
Kinda
The Visitation
Black Orchid
Earthshock
Time-Flight

Season 20

Arc of Infinity (Parts 2–4)
Snakedance
Mawdryn Undead
Terminus
Enlightenment
The King's Demons

20th anniversary special
The Five Doctors
Season 21

Warriors of the Deep
The Awakening
Frontios
Resurrection of the Daleks
The Caves of Androzani (cameo in part 4)

2022 Specials 
 "The Power of the Doctor"

Audio dramas
Doctor Who: The Monthly Adventures

The Gathering
Cobwebs
The Whispering Forest
The Cradle of the Snake
Heroes of Sontar
Kiss of Death
Rat Trap
The Emerald Tiger
The Jupiter Conjunction
The Butcher of Brisbane
Eldrad Must Die!
The Lady of Mercia
Prisoners of Fate
Mistfall
Equilibrium
The Entropy Plague
The Waters of Amsterdam
Aquitaine
The Peterloo Massacre
The Star Men
The Contingency Club
Zaltys
Time in Office
Kingdom of Lies
Ghost Walk
Serpent in the Silver Mask
Devil in the Mist
Black Thursday / Power Game
The Kamelion Empire
Tartarus
Interstitial / Feast of Fear
Warzone / Conversion
Madquake

Doctor Who: The Lost Stories

The Elite
Hexagora
The Children of Seth
Nightmare Country

Doctor Who: The Fifth Doctor Adventures

The Fifth Doctor Box Set
Psychodrome 
Iterations of I
The Lost Resort and Other Stories
The Lost Resort
The Perils of Nellie Bly
Nightmare of the Daleks
Forty: Volume One
Secrets of Telos
God of War

Doctor Who: Novel Adaptations

Cold Fusion

Doctor Who: Special Releases

Destiny of the Doctor: Smoke and Mirrors
The Light at the End

Doctor Who: The Companion Chronicles

The Darkening Eye (narrated by Nyssa)
Ringpullworld (narrated by Turlough)
Freakshow (narrated by Turlough)

Doctor Who: Short Trips

The Lions of Trafalgar
The King of the Dead
Gardens of the Dead
The Monkey House
The Mistpuddle Murders

Novels
Virgin Missing Adventures
Goth Opera by Paul Cornell
The Crystal Bucephalus by Craig Hinton
The Sands of Time by Justin Richards
Cold Fusion by Lance Parkin
Past Doctor Adventures
Zeta Major by Simon Messingham
Deep Blue by Mark Morris
Divided Loyalties by Gary Russell
The King of Terror by Keith Topping
Fear of the Dark by Trevor Baxendale

Short stories

"Birth of a Renegade" by Eric Saward (Radio Times Doctor Who 20th Anniversary Special)
"Lackaday Express" by Paul Cornell (Decalog)
"Hearts of Stone" by Steve Lyons (Short Trips: Companions)
"Qualia" by Stephen Fewell (Short Trips: Companions)
"Soul Mate" by David Bailey (Short Trips: A Universe of Terrors)
"No Exit" by Kate Orman (Short Trips: Steel Skies)
"The Immortals" by Simon Guerrier (Short Trips: Past Tense)
"Fixing a Hole" by Samantha Baker (Short Trips: Past Tense)
"Lant Land" by Jonathan Morris (Short Trips: Life Science)
"The Assassin's Story" by Andrew Collins (Short Trips: Repercussions)
"Categorical Imperative" by Simon Guerrier (Short Trips: Monsters)
"In the TARDIS: Christmas Day" by Val Douglas (Short Trips: A Christmas Treasury)
"Last Minute Shopping" by Neil Perryman (Short Trips: A Christmas Treasury)
"Rome" by Marcus Flavin (Short Trips: The History of Christmas)
"Keeping it Real" by Joseph Lidster (Short Trips: The Ghosts of Christmas)
"Goths and Robbers" by Diane Duane (Short Trips: The Quality of Leadership)
"Gudok" by Mags L Halliday (Short Trips: Transmissions)
"The Darkest Corner" by Adrian Middleton (Shelf Life)

Comics
"On The Planet Isopterus" by Glenn Rix (Doctor Who Annual 1983)
"The Lunar Strangers" by Gareth Roberts and Martin Geraghty (Doctor Who Magazine 215–217)
"Blood Invocation" by Paul Cornell and John Ridgway (Doctor Who Magazine Yearbook 1995)

References

External links

 Tegan Jovanka on the BBC's Doctor Who website

Television characters introduced in 1981
Doctor Who companions
Doctor Who audio characters
Female characters in television
Fictional people from Queensland
Fictional flight attendants